The Asian Health Literacy Association (AHLA) is an association which aims to provide an overview of the health literacy status in Asia and to measure health literacy levels across Asia. The study involves close collaboration between universities, research institutions and ministries across Asia. Not only will the current state of health literacy in identified countries be evaluated but the health services and healthcare deliveries will be compared. Social and cultural determinants as well as measures to enhance the health service capacities in each country will also be considered.

Objective 
Health literacy encompasses people’s knowledge, motivation and competences to access, understand, appraise, and apply health information. The Asian Health Literacy Association seeks to understand health literacy levels across Asia in order to inform the direction of future efforts to enhance health service capacities. Furthermore, the association aims to explore the influence of health literacy in the healthcare system, disease prevention and health promotion. Researchers, government bodies, healthcare groups, health and educational professionals working in the above or related fields might participate in this project, discussing health literacy issues in order to develop possible interventions in health education and healthcare services.

AHLA promotes health literacy as an effective way to improve healthcare quality and reducing health disparities between communities, groups and nations. Improving communication between patients, patient organizations, caregivers, health service providers, administrative agencies, policy-makers, and the media can promote health literacy and result in better-coordinated and more efficient health systems that protect people from health risks. Strong partnerships between national health literacy programs allow all stakeholders to benefit from the best ideas in health from around the world. AHLA will support these initiatives and promote health literacy in regional and global forums.

Health Literacy Study-Asia  
The Asian Health Literacy Association holds a HLS-Asia project, which has been designed to mirror a similar international study, the European Health Literacy Survey (HLS-EU). The purpose of Health Literacy Study-Asia (HLS-Asia) project is to measure health literacy levels across Asia and to provide an overview of the health literacy status in Asia. The study involves close collaboration between universities, research institutions and ministries across Asia. Not only will the current state of health literacy in identified countries be evaluated but the health services and healthcare deliveries will be compared. Social and cultural determinants as well as measures to enhance the health service capacities in each country will also be considered. This project has received support from The Taiwan National Science Council, Ministry of Health and Welfare, and Ministry of Foreign Affairs.

International Conference

Aim 
Asian health knowledge can international cooperation in research originated from the University of Maastricht, The Netherlands dominated the EU seventh research program (FP7) of the European cross-border health consciousness energy research (in English by the eight European countries: FP 7, EU-Health Literacy Survey; HLS-EU; 2009-2012) of the project team and the national health promotion experts since October 2012 Comparative study of international cooperation can (English began to promote the Asian health knowledge: Health Literacy Study Asia- HLSA)

Participating countries 
Participating countries included Taiwan, Japan, Pakistan, Indonesia, Kyrgyzstan, Kazakhstan, South Korea, the Philippines, Cambodia race, Malaysia, Vietnam, Sri Lanka, Myanmar, Mongolia, Laos and other Asian countries, more than ten, together with Asian countries to promote inter-community long-term stability and common prosperity and development in close cooperation culture and health, as well as the region.

1st International Conference 
The first International Conference on Health Literacy and Better Healthcare: EU and Asia was held in 2013 in Taipei, Taiwan.

This event was organized by the Asian Health Literacy Society with support from Taiwan’s National Science Council and Ministry of Health and Welfare, the Taipei City Government Department of Health, the Kaohsiung City and Taitung County Governments, the European Economic and Trade Office, the Ministry of Foreign Affairs and MJGroup.

The conference discusses global health literacy issues and explores their implications for better healthcare. Distinguished international speakers and professionals from more than 15 Asian and European countries and from 20 institutions will attend, as the conference provides a platform for health professionals and health literacy scholars to share experiences while establishing an Asian health literacy network.

Conference themes
 Health Literacy and Policy Implementation.
 HLS-EU and HLS-Asia.
 Global Health Literacy Development and Cultural Competence.
 International Corporation and Health Literacy Organization.
 Health Literacy working in the communities.
 Health Literacy in multi-disciplinary partnership.
 Health Literacy and effectiveness.

2nd International Conference 
The 2nd International Conference on Health Literacy and Health Promotion to be held from October 6 to 8 October 2014 in Taipei, Taiwan.

Conference themes
 Health literacy and policy: health policy and governance, health civil society, health inequalities.
 Health literacy and community: health city, healthy ageing environment, healthy living environment and design, enhancing and creating health literate settings.
 Health literacy and hospital: healthcare for non-communicable diseases management (NCDs, diabetes, hypertension, cardiovascular disorders, renal diseases, et al.), high-risk vulnerable individuals.
 Health literacy and education: education and curriculum for health literacy, intervention via school educations.
 Health literacy and occupational environment: industry and business health-literacy friendly environment, occupational health and physical activities and health literacy, health literacy as corporate social responsibility.
 Health literacy in the media and social marketing.
 Health literacy in nutrition and food safety.
 Reproductive health, mental health, and health literacy.
 Health literacy in migrant and minorities.
 Research on measuring HL, on determinants of HL and on consequences or impacts of HL on different aspects of health.

References 

Medical and health organizations based in Taiwan